The symmetric hash join is a special type of hash join designed for data streams.

Algorithm
 For each input, create a hash table.
 For each new record, hash and insert into inputs hash table.
 Test if input is equal to a predefined set of other inputs.
 If so, output the records.

See also
 Data stream management system
 Data stream mining

References

Hashing
Join algorithms